The history of the Jews in Regensburg, Germany reaches back over 1,000 years. The Jews of Regensburg are part of Bavarian Jewry; Regensburg was the capital of the Upper Palatinate and formerly a free city of the German empire. The great age of the Jewish community in this city is indicated by the tradition that a Jewish colony existed there before the common era; it is undoubtedly the oldest Jewish settlement in Bavaria of which any records exist.

Early history
The earliest historical reference to Jews in Ratisbon (Regensburg) is in a document of 981, where it is stated that the monastery of St. Emmeram bought a piece of property from the Jew Samuel (Aronius, "Regesten", No. 135). The Jewish quarter, "Judæorum habitacula", is mentioned as early as the beginning of the 11th century (1006–28), and is the oldest German ghetto to which there is any reference in historical sources (Aronius, l.c. No. 150). The Jews were granted their first privileges there in a charter of 1182. Therein Emperor Frederick I. confirmed the rights they had received by the favor of his predecessors, and assigned to them, as to their coreligionists throughout the empire, the status of chamber servants (Kammerknechtschaft in German). But their political position became complicated later after the emperor transferred them to the dukes of Lower Bavaria without releasing them from their obligations as chamber servants. To these overlords the Jews of Ratisbon were pawned in 1322 for the yearly sum of 200 pounds of Ratisbon pfennigs, but they were also subject to taxation by the municipal council of the city, though they received some compensation in the fact that thereby they secured the protection of the city council against the excessive demands of the emperor and the dukes.
(see image) Interior of the Old Synagogue at Ratisbon (from a drawing by Altdorfer)

History of the community 
During the first Crusade (1096) the community suffered like many others in Germany. An old chronicle says with reference to the persecutions that took place in Franconia and Swabia in 1298 : "The citizens of Ratisbon desired to honor their city by forbidding the persecution of the Jews or the slaying of them without legal sentence."                                              The wave of fanaticism which swept over Germany in 1349 was checked at Ratisbon, in a similar spirit, by the declaration of the magistrates and the citizens that they would protect and defend their Jews. The municipal council again shielded them by punishing only the guilty when, in 1384, a riot occurred because some Jews had been convicted of giving false returns of their property to the tax-assessor. The protestations of the magistrates, however, could not protect their wards against the exactions of the emperor Wenzel when (1385–90) he replenished his purse by contributions levied upon the German Jews. In the following years they were again heavily taxed by both emperor and dukes, and in 1410 the magistrates, tired of ineffectual protest, took part in the game of spoliation by making an agreement with the duke that the Jews should pay 200 florins a year to him and 60 pounds a year to the city, extraordinary taxes to be divided between the two. This marks the turning-point in the history of the Jews of Ratisbon, who were henceforth abandoned to their fate; religious intolerance and social prejudice threatened their very existence.

The overall impoverishment of the city fueled tensions between 1475 and 1519, and ultimately culminated in the expulsion of the Jewish community. The anti-Semitic preachings of Peter Nigri led to the confiscating of the Jews' property in 1476, and the community was then thrown into chaos by the Simon of Trent trial in Italy. The Jewish community of Trent, in a blood libel, was accused of murdering a Christian boy for ritual purposes. While being tortured, one of the accused Jews said something about the Jewish community of Ratisbon using the blood of Christian children in ritual to make Passover matzo. Word was sent to Ratisbon, and seventeen Jews were arrested. They remained imprisoned for four years, and were released only after repeated requests from Frederick III. Later, the Anabaptist Balthasar Hubmaier called for the expulsion of Jews from the city, turning their synagogue into a church, and accused them of usury. When Maximilian died, the opportunity was taken to expel the Jews from the city, 800 in all, in 1519. Afterwards, about 5,000 tombstones from the Jewish cemetery were razed and used as building material. The synagogue was also razed and a chapel was built on the site, which became a popular pilgrimage place.

Cemetery and synagogue 

The first cemetery of the community of Ratisbon was situated on a hillock, still called the "Judenau". In 1210 the congregation bought from the monastery of St Emmeram a plot of ground, outside the present Peterthor, for a new cemetery, which was destroyed in the course of excavations made in the city in 1877. It served as a burial-ground for all the Jews of Upper and Lower Bavaria, and, in consequence of the catastrophe of February 21, 1519, mentioned above, more than 4,000 of its gravestones are said to have been either demolished or used in the building of churches. The synagogue that was destroyed was an edifice in Old Romanesque style, erected between 1210 and 1227 on the site of the former Jewish hospital, in the center of the ghetto, where the present Neue Pfarre stands. The ghetto was separated from the city itself by walls and closed by gates.

Notable Jews from Regensburg 

 Pethahiah ben Jacob ha-Laban (born at Prague, flourished between 1175 and 1190), traveler
Isaac ben Mordecai of Regensburg,  12th century tosafist.
Abraham ben Moses of Regensburg (flourished about 1200), tosafist
 Wolfkan of Ratisbon (2nd half of the 15th century), Jewish convert to Christianity and traducer of the Jews
 Isaac Alexander (2nd half of the 18th century)

Scholars 

The "ḥakme Regensburg" of the 12th century were regarded far and wide as authorities, and a number of tosafists flourished in this ancient community. Especially noteworthy were Rabbi Ephraim ben Isaac (d. about 1175), one of the most prominent teachers of the Law and a liturgical poet, and Rabbi Baruch ben Isaac, author of the "Sefer ha-Terumah" and of tosafot to the treatise Zebaḥim. The best known of all was Rabbi Judah ben Samuel he-Ḥasid (died 1217), the author of the Sefer Ḥasidim and of various halakic and liturgical works. The Talmudic school of Ratisbon became famous in the 15th century; a chronicle of 1478 says, "This academy has furnished 'doctores et patres' for all parts of Germany." Rabbi Israel Bruna (15th century) narrowly escaped falling a victim to an accusation of ritual murder. The chronicler Anselmus de Parengar gives an interesting description of the magnificent apartments of the grand master Samuel Belassar. Shortly before the dispersion of the community Rabbi Jacob Margolioth, the father of the convert and anti-Jewish writer Antonius Margarita, was living at Ratisbon; he is referred to in the Epistolæ Obscurorum Virorum as the Primus Judæorum Ratisbonensis. Finally, the learned Litte (Liwe) of Ratisbon may be mentioned, the author of the "Samuelbuch", which paraphrased the history of King David in the meter of the Nibelungenlied.

In modern times

1660–1900
In 1669 Jews were again permitted to reside in Ratisbon, but it was not until April 2, 1841 that the community was able to dedicate its new synagogue. Rabbi Isaac Alexander (born Ratisbon August  22, 1722) was probably the first rabbi to write in German. His successor appears to have been Rabbi Weil, who was succeeded by Sonnentheil and the teacher Dr. Schlenker. From 1860 to 1882 the rabbinate was occupied by Dr. Löwenmeyer of Sulzburg, who was followed in January, 1882, by Dr. Seligmann Meyer, the editor of the "Deutsche Israelitische Zeitung". The present (1905) total population of Ratisbon is 45,426, of whom about 600 are Jews.

1901–present

References

Jewish Encyclopedia Bibliography 
 For earlier works on Ratisbon see C. G. Weber, Literatur der Deutschen Staatengesch. i. 709–720, Leipsic, 1800;
 a list of more recent works is given in Stern, Quellenkunde zur Gesch. der Deutschen Juden, i. 49–50. See also: C. Th. Gemeiner, Chronik der Stadt und des Hochstifts Regensburg (Ratisbon, 1800–24);
 Christopher Ostrofrancus, Tractatus de Ratisbona Metropoli Bojoariœ et Subita Ihidem Judœorum, Augsburg, 1519;
 Oefele, Rerum Boicarum Scriptores, 1763;
 Thomas Ried, Codex Chronologico-Diplomaticus Episcopatus Ratisbonensis, Ratisbon, 1816;
 Janner, Gesch. der Bischöfe von Regensburg;
 Gumpelzhaimer, Regensburger Geschichte, Sagen und Merkwürdigkeiten, ib.1830–40;
 Count Hugo von Walderdorff, Regensburg in Seiner Vergangenheit und Gegenwart, 4th ed., ib. 1896;
 Bavaria, Landes- und Volkskunde des Königsreiches Bayern, ii. 675 et seq.;
 Meïr Wiener, Regesten zur Geschichte der Juden in Deutschland während des Mittelalters, 1862;
 Aronius, Regesten;
 Stobbe, Die Juden in Deutschland Während des Mittelalters, 1866, pp. 67–83;
 Train, Die Wichtigsten Tatsachen aus der Gesch. der Juden in Regensburg, in Allg. Zeit. für die Hist. Theologie, 1837, vii. 39–138;
 L. Geiger, Zur Gesch. der Juden in Regensburg, in Geiger's Jüd. Zeit. 1867, pp. 16 et seq.;
 M. Stern, Aus der Aelteren Gesch. der Juden in Regensburg, in Geiger's Zeit. für Gesch. der Juden in Deutschland, i. 383 et seq.;
 H. Bresslau, Zur Gesch. der Juden in Deutschland, in Moritz Steinschneider, Hebr. Bibl. 1870, x. 107 et seq.;
 Monatsschrift, 1867, pp. 161 et seq., 389 et seq.;
 1868, pp. 345 et seq.;
 Lehmann, Der Israelit, 1877, No. 48, p. 1150;
 Grätz, Gesch.;
 Ost und West, Monatsschrift für Modernes Judentum, 1901, pp. 831–833;
 Aretin, Gesch. der Juden in Bayern, 1803;
 Kohut, Gesch. der Deutschen Juden

Further reading 
 Karl Bauer: Regensburg. 4. Aufl., Regensburg 1988. , insb. S. 126–129
 Barbara Beuys: Heimat und Hölle - Jüdisches Leben in Europa durch zwei Jahrtausende. Reinbek 1996. 
 Arno Herzig: Jüdische Geschichte in Deutschland. München 1997. 
 "Regensburg: (Bearbeiter: Barbara Eberhardt, Cornelia Berger-Dittscheid). In: Mehr als Steine... Synagogen-Gedenkband Bayern. Band I. Hrsg. von Wolfgang Kraus, Berndt Hamm und Meier Schwarz. Erarbeitet von Barbara Eberhardt und Angela Hager unter Mitarbeit von Cornelia Berger-Dittscheid, Hans Christof Haas und Frank Purrmann. Kunstverlag Josef Fink, Lindenberg im Allgäu 2007. . S. 261–285
 Sylvia Seifert: "Einblicke in das Leben jüdischer Frauen in Regensburg"; Teil 1 und 2. In: Regensburger Frauenspuren. Eine historische Entdeckungsreise. Hrsg. von Ute Kätzel, Karin Schrott. Pustet Verlag, Regensburg 1995. . S. 86-106 und S. 151–161

External links 
 Jewish Community Regensburg

Regensburg
Regensburg
Regensburg
Jewish history